The 2004 Texas Tech Red Raiders football team represented Texas Tech University as a member of the Big 12 Conference during the 2004 NCAA Division I-A football season. In their fifth season under head coach Mike Leach, the Red Raiders compiled an overall record of 8–4 record with a mark of 5–3 in conference play, finished in a tie for third place in Southern Division of the Big 12, defeated California in the 2004 Holiday Bowl, and outscored opponents by a combined total of 434 to 314. The team played its home games at Jones SBC Stadium in Lubbock, Texas.

The team was led by senior quarterback Sonny Cumbie, who finished the season with 4,742 passing yards, 32 touchdowns, and 18 interceptions, leading the NCAA in passing yards. Cumbie would later serve as an assistant coach for the program starting in 2009, eventually being promoted to co-offensive coordinator in 2013. He would then serve as TCU's offensive coordinator from 2014 to 2020. Cumbie would return to Texas Tech following the 2020 season, being hired as offensive coordinator and quarterbacks coach under head coach Matt Wells. In 2021, Cumbie would be promoted to interim head coach after Wells was fired on October 25.

Previous season
The 2003 team finished the season 8–5, 4–4 in Big 12 play, finishing in 4th place in the Southern Division. The team was invited to the Houston Bowl, defeating Navy 38–14. Quarterback B. J. Symons won the Sammy Baugh Trophy, while wide receiver Wes Welker won the Mosi Tatupu Award.

NFL draftees

Schedule

Personnel

Game summaries

at SMU

at New Mexico

TCU

The Horned Frogs jumped out to a 21–0 lead midway through the second quarter before the Red Raiders scored 56 unanswered points.

at Kansas

Texas Tech got on the board first, with Kansas running back John Randle being tackled in his own end zone for a safety. The Jayhawks then scored 14 unanswered points, with a 36-yard pass from Adam Barmann to Randle and a 1-yard Randle run. Texas Tech would then respond with a 34-yard field goal from Alex Trlica with under a minute left in the first quarter. Kansas went on another scoring run in the second, scoring 16 unanswered points, including a pass from wide receiver Charles Gordon to Brandon Rideau. Gordon would then score on a receiving touchdown from Barmann, but the ensuing two-point pass would fail. The Red Raiders would score their first touchdown in the closing seconds of the first half, with a 32-yard pass from Sonny Cumbie to Trey Haverty. Texas Tech would attempt a two-point conversion, but the pass fell incomplete. The Red Raiders went into halftime trailing 11–30. The Jayhawks were shutout in the second half as the Red Raiders scored 20 unanswered points, with running back Taurean Henderson scoring the game-winning touchdown with 2:37 left.

Quarterback Sonny Cumbie had an uneven game, completing 28-of-52 passes (53.8%) for 356 yards with two touchdowns and four interceptions. Wide receiver Danny Amendola lost a fumble, bringing the Red Raiders' turnover total to five. The Jayhawks would capitalize on the turnovers, scoring 16 points off of turnovers. Kansas would commit three turnovers, all interceptions by quarterback Adam Barmann.

at Oklahoma

Nebraska

Texas Tech forced eight turnovers while only committing one and had 523 yards of total offense while Nebraska only had 292. The 70 points given up and the 60 point margin of defeat are both the largest in Nebraska school history. In 2020, the Omaha World-Herald ranked this game as the seventh most painful loss in the Cornhuskers' history since a 36–62 loss to Colorado in 2001.

Texas

at Kansas State

Baylor

at Texas A&M

Oklahoma State

vs. California (Holiday Bowl)

Rankings

Players drafted into the NFL

References

Texas Tech
Texas Tech Red Raiders football seasons
Holiday Bowl champion seasons
Texas Tech Red Raiders football